Misfits or The Misfits may refer to:

Film and television
 The Misfits (1961 film), a film starring Clark Gable, Marilyn Monroe, and Montgomery Clift
 The Misfits (2011 film), a Mexican film
 The Misfits (2021 film), an American film
 Misfits (TV series), a British television series

Music

Albums
 Misfits (Blanco & The Jacka album)
 Misfits (Sara Hickman album)
 Misfits (The Kinks album)
 Misfits (Misfits album)
 The Misfits (album), a box set by the Misfits

Songs
 "Misfits" (Cold Chisel song)
 "Misfits" (The Kinks song)
 "Misfits" (Neil Young song)

Other uses in music
 Misfits (band), an American punk rock band from New Jersey
 Misfits (quartet), a barbershop quartet
 Misfits, a British rock band formed in 1979 by Rusty Egan and Midge Ure
 The Misfits, a fictional musical group in the television series Jem
 Misfits Records

Other uses
 MISFITS, the Minnesota Society for Interest in Science Fiction and Fantasy
 The Misfits: A Study of Sexual Outsiders, by Colin Henry Wilson
 The Misfits, a novel by James Howe
 Misfits, a documentary play by Alex Finlayson about the making of the 1961 film
 Misfits Gaming, a professional e-sports team in Europe

See also
 Misfit (disambiguation)